Idan Golan (born 29 February 1996) is an Israeli footballer who plays for Liga Leumit side Ironi Tiberias.

Career statistics

Club

Notes

Honours

Club
Hapoel Haifa
 Israel State Cup (1): 2017–18

References

1996 births
Living people
Israeli footballers
Hapoel Haifa F.C. players
Hapoel Ramat Gan F.C. players
Hapoel Nof HaGalil F.C. players
FC Universitatea Cluj players
FC Voluntari players
Ironi Tiberias F.C. players
Israeli Premier League players
Liga Leumit players
Liga I players
Liga II players
People from Ramat Yishay
Footballers from Northern District (Israel)
Expatriate footballers in Romania
Israeli expatriate sportspeople in Romania
Association football forwards